Christian Obodo (born 11 May 1984 in Warri, Nigeria) is a Nigerian former footballer who played as a defensive midfielder.

Football career
He was plucked from relative obscurity in the Nigerian league, playing for Plateau United before he became one of the hottest properties in the Italian Serie A where he had a brilliant season at Perugia. He scored his first ever Serie A goal in a 2–2 draw against Inter at the end of the season 2003.

Fiorentina signed him as a key part of their renovation as the team came back to Serie A in 2004. They only bought half the registration rights and in 2005 La Viola and Perugia were forced to make a blind auction to decide his future. Perugia won the auction but immediately sold him to Udinese.

Obodo played his first UEFA Champions League with Le zebrette in 2005–06 season, partnered in midfield with Sulley Muntari, up until Muntari's exit for Portsmouth F.C. in 2007.

On 28 January 2014, the Portuguese side S.C. Olhanense announced they had agreed to a deal with Obodo after playing in a training game against Lokomotiv Moscow.

International career
In 2001, Obodo played for the Flying Eagles coached by Stephen Keshi at the African Youth Championship in Ethiopia. Though the team crashed out of the tournament with just one point from 3 games, Obodo showed a lot of promise in a team that had other players such as Bartholomew Ogbeche and Christopher Justice.

Obodo is regarded by many as one of the most skilful and talented midfielders to play for the Super Eagles since the 1994 era. Little wonder, a sports radio personality and media mogul – noted for nicknaming Nigerian footballers – describes him as bundle of skills, a phrase which later stuck and is now synonymous with Obodo's skilfulness.

Obodo exudes a high level of confidence in games. He is never shy of taking on opponents. Renowned for his dribbling, energetic play and surging runs, he is best when he plays through the centre of the pitch where he dribbles and often makes surging runs towards goal.

He made his long-awaited debut for the Super Eagles in the LG Cup tournament in 2003 featuring in the games versus Ghana and Cameroon. He also made a substitute appearance in the prestigious Brazil friendly, playing as a striker. He has also appeared in Nigeria's 4–1 win over Malawi in an ANC 2004 qualifier. Obodo scored his first goal in a 5–2 win at Algeria.

He made six appearances out of 10 in the 2006 World Cup qualification series, scoring a goal. At the 2006 African Cup of Nations, he featured in 4 of Nigeria's six games, scoring in the 2–0 win over Zimbabwe. Obodo last played for the Super Eagles in 2008.

Abduction
On the morning of 9 June 2012, Obodo was reportedly kidnapped by gunmen near Warri, Delta State. He was rescued the next day in nearby Isoko by men of the Nigerian police force, no ransom was paid, and suspects were arrested.

Career statistics

Club

International

International goals

Honours
Perugia
UEFA Intertoto Cup: 2003

References

1984 births
Living people
Sportspeople from Warri
Nigerian footballers
Association football midfielders
Nigeria international footballers
2006 Africa Cup of Nations players
Nigerian expatriate footballers
Expatriate footballers in Italy
Expatriate footballers in Belarus
Expatriate footballers in Portugal
Expatriate footballers in Greece
Expatriate footballers in Romania
Liga I players
Serie A players
Serie B players
Plateau United F.C. players
A.C. Perugia Calcio players
ACF Fiorentina players
Udinese Calcio players
Torino F.C. players
U.S. Lecce players
FC Dinamo Minsk players
S.C. Olhanense players
Xanthi F.C. players
CS Concordia Chiajna players
CS Pandurii Târgu Jiu players
Apollon Smyrnis F.C. players
Belarusian Premier League players
Primeira Liga players
Super League Greece players
Football League (Greece) players